Bordes may refer to:

Places

France
 Ampilly-les-Bordes, in the Côte-d'Or department
 Arricau-Bordes, in the Pyrénées-Atlantiques department
 Bordes, Hautes-Pyrénées, in the Hautes-Pyrénées department
 Bordes, Pyrénées-Atlantiques, in the Pyrénées-Atlantiques department
 Bordes-de-Rivière, in the Haute-Garonne department
 Jabreilles-les-Bordes, in the Haute-Vienne department
 La Celle-les-Bordes, in the Yvelines department
 Saint-Simon-de-Bordes, in the Charente-Maritime department
 Vier-Bordes, in the Hautes-Pyrénées department
 Villeneuve-les-Bordes, in the Seine-et-Marne department

Elsewhere
 Bordes d'Envalira, in Andorra
 Es Bòrdes, in Catalonia, Spain

People with the surname
 Armonia Bordes (born 1945), French politician
 Bertrand des Bordes (died 1311), French cardinal and bishop
 Charles Bordes (1863-1909), French composer
 François Bordes (1919-1981), French geologist
 Juan Bordes (born 1948), Spanish sculptor
 Marguerite Broquedis Bordes (1893-1983), French tennis player
 Marie-Léontine Bordes-Pène (1858-1924), French pianist
 Pamella Bordes (born 1961), Indian photographer

See also
 Bordes scene, a Dutch political ceremony
 La Borde
 Laborde
 Les Bordes (disambiguation)